The Somali Youth League (SYL) (Arabic:  رابطة الشباب الصومالي,  or Lega Somala della Gioventù), initially known as the Somali Youth Club (SYC), was the first political party in Somalia. 

It played a key role in the nation's road to independence during the 1940s, 1950s and 1960s.

History

British Military Administration

Somali Youth Club 
During the Second World War, Britain occupied Italian Somaliland and militarily administered the territory from 1941 to 1950. Faced with growing Italian political pressure inimical to continued British tenure and Somali aspirations for independence, the Somalis and the British came to see each other as allies. The first modern Somali political party, the Somali Youth Club (SYC), was subsequently established in Mogadishu in 1943. The professed goal of the SYC was to free the Somali masses from decades of colonial propaganda created with the intent to divide-and-rule the country.

Formation of Somali Youth League 
At its foundation in 1943, the party had thirteen founding members. 5 Hawiye, 4 Darod, 2 Rahanweyn, 2 Benadiri. The Harari would become members in 1946 when SYL opened an office in Harar. SYL supported Greater Somalia with Harar being the capital and a combined Harari-Somali representatives were commissioned to reveal this proposal to the U.N office in Mogadishu. Somali Youth League members were significantly influenced by the earlier religious rebellion at the turn of the century of various religious figures such as Uways al-Barawi, Sheikh Hassan Barsane and Mohammed Abdullah Hassan. 

To empower the new party, the better educated police and civil servants were permitted to join it. By 1948, following an official visit to the territory by the Four Power Commission, the SYC was a well-structured political unit, Abdullahi Issa was elected as its secretary general and renamed itself as the Somali Youth League (SYL) and began to open offices not only in Italian and British Somaliland, but also in the Ogaden and in the Northern Frontier District (NFD). The SYL's stated objectives were to unify all Somali territories, including the NFD and the Ogaden; to create opportunities for universal modern education; to develop the Somali language by a standard national orthography; to safeguard Somali interests; and to oppose the restoration of Italian rule. SYL policy banned clannishness so that the thirteen founding members, although representing four of Somalia's five major clans, refused to disclose their clan affiliations. Although the SYL enjoyed considerable popular support from northerners, the principal parties in British Somaliland were the Somali National League (SNL) and National United Front (NUF), mainly associated with the Isaaq clan, and the United Somali Party (USP), which had the support of the Dir (Gadabuursi) and Darod (Dulbahante and Warsangali) clans.

Trust Territory of Somaliland 

In 1945, the Potsdam conference was held, where it was decided not to return Italian Somaliland to Italy. The Somali Youth League had proposed a UN Trusteeship to lead Somalia to independence, under the condition that it was not under Italian administration and that the Trusteeship managed all Somali territories. In a memo to the UN the SYL stated: "We do not pretend we can stand on our own feet for the moment, but ask the United Nations Trusteeship council to decide questions relating to the formation, boundaries, and administration of a Somali Trust Territory known as Somalia, this territory to consist of all areas present predominantly populated by Somalis."In November 1949 the United Nations granted Italy trusteeship of the former Italian Somaliland. 

The Somali Youth League was firmly against Italian return to Somalia in any form, and campaigned against the return of Italian rule with the slogan, "No matter what the color, a wolf is always a wolf." Before the Italians returned to Somalia, the SYL held a major summit in order to formulate a common policy and unified attitude toward the Trusteeship government. It was initially decided to launch an armed resistance, but after serious deliberation the league came to the conclusion that a more temperate course would be better for Somali citizens. Following the summits conclusion the SYL delivered a paper to the chief Italian administrator explaining its position. The League informed the administration that it would continue to agitate for independence and expressed hope that the new government would not resist SYL efforts. It was made clear that the organization was willing to cooperate with the Trusteeship authorities if they reciprocated. The League demanded that Arabic be made the official language of the Trusteeship instead of Italian and further requested that Italian government not bring back officials from the fascist era.

The first half of AFIS's decade long rule would be marked by animosity and conflict between the Italian authorities and the Somali Youth League. Numerous SYL officials who had gained positions of prominence during the era of British Military Administration were either demoted, removed from their positions or imprisoned by Italians officials. These attempts to marginalize the league would lead to demonstrations across the country which were strongly repressed by the government, who had at the time come to decision not cooperate or concede to the SYL's plans.

Indepedence and formation Somali Republic 

British Somaliland remained a protectorate of Britain until June 26, 1960, when it became independent. The former Italian Somaliland followed suit five days later. On July 1, 1960, the two territories united to form the Somali Republic, albeit within boundaries drawn up by Italy and Britain. A government was formed by Abdullahi Issa Mohamud and Muhammad Haji Ibrahim Egal with Aden Abdullah Osman Daar as the first President of the Somali Republic, and Abdirashid Ali Shermarke as Prime Minister, later to become President (from 1967-1969). On July 20, 1961 and through a popular referendum, the Somali people ratified a new constitution, which was first drafted in 1960.

In the first national elections after independence, held on 30 March 1964, the SYL won an absolute majority of 69 of the 123 parliamentary seats. The remaining seats were divided among 11 parties. Five years from then, in general elections held in March 1969, the ruling SYL led by Mohammed Ibrahim Egal returned to power. However, in the same year, then President of Somalia Abdirashid Ali Sharmarke was assassinated.

1969 Coup d'etat and dissolution 

In 1969 military coup ensued, with Siad Barre now assuming leadership. Barre's Supreme Revolutionary Council (SRC) subsequently renamed the country the Somali Democratic Republic, arrested members of the former government, banned political parties, dissolved the parliament and the Supreme Court, and suspended the constitution.

Political leaders

Founders and leaders
The following is a list of the SYL's 13 original founder members, 

 Abdulkadir Sheikh Sakhawudeen
 Yasin Haji Osman Sharmarke
Dahir Haji Osman Sharmarke (Dhegaweyne)
 Mohamed Hirsi Nur (Seyedin)
 Aden Isaaq Ahmed (Borama)
 Haji Mahamed Hussein Mahad
 Osman Geedi Rage
 Dhere Haji Dhere
 Ali Hasan Maslah
 Mohamed Ali Nur,
 Mohamed Farah Hilowle
 H. Mohamed Abdullahi Hayesi
 Marwan Osman Mohamed

Notable members
The following is a list of other notable public officials that emerged from the SYL's ranks:

Presidents
Aden Abdullah Osman Daar: July 1, 1960 – June 10, 1967;
Abdirashid Ali Shermarke: July 6, 1967 – October 15, 1969;
Mukhtar Mohamed Hussein: October 15, 1969 – October 21, 1969
Said Aaran Ibrahim : July 20, 1967 - December 15, 1982;

Prime Ministers
Abdullahi Issa Mohamud: February 29, 1956 – July 12, 1960
Abdirashid Ali Shermarke: July 1, 1960 – June 10, 1964
Abdirizak Haji Hussein: June 14, 1964 – July 15, 1967
Muhammad Haji Ibrahim Egal: July 15, 1967 –  October 21, 1969
 Aden Isaaq Ahmed: October 21, 1969 to Siad's coup
Umar Arteh Ghalib: January 24, 1991 – May 1993

Presidents of the Somali National Assembly
Haji Bashir Ismail Yusuf: July 1, 1960 – mid-July 1960
Jama Abdullahi Qalib: mid-July 1960 – May 26, 1964
Ahmed Mohamed Obsiye: May 26, 1964 – 1967
Mukhtar Mohamed Hussein: 1967 – October 15, 1969

Ministers
Abdillahi Mohammed Ahmed: Minister of National and Coordination
Sheekh Cabdiqani Sheekh Axmed: Minister of Justice and Religion Affairs
Haji Farah Ali Omar: Minister of Economic Affairs
Hirsi Bulhan Farah: Minister of livestock
Mohamed Said Samatar: Minister of State
Sheikh Ali Jimale: Minister of Health, Labour and Veterinary Service
Michael Mariano: Minister of Economic Planning
Parliamentarians
Osman Haji Mohamed: MP for El Dheer

Other
Ali Shido Abdi: Vice-Chairman of the SYL
Lewis Clement Salool: Lewis designed the SYL flag in Addis Ababa, Ethiopia, in 1942
Ali Herzi Farah: Honourable speaker & Central committee member

Somali Youth Day
The Somali Youth League's establishment on May 15, 1943 is annually commemorated in Somalia. Official celebrations are organized throughout the country on this Somali Youth Day to honour the SYL's members and their key role in the nation's path to independence. In 2014, government representatives, youth associations, women's groups, singers and local residents celebrated the Somali Youth League's 71st anniversary.

See also
History of Somalia
List of political parties in Somalia
Elections in Somalia

References

Sources

External links
SYL election results

Political history of Somalia
1943 establishments in Somalia
Political parties established in 1943
Defunct political parties in Somalia
Somali nationalism
Banned political parties